A Workgang is a group of individuals who are assigned, or engaged in, a common task.
Examples include Prison Workgangs used for farming, construction, trash collection/waste management, fire fighting, or inmate emergency services.
Such workgangs have varying levels of supervision ranging from Armed Corrections Officers, Unarmed Community Supervision, to self-supervised Trustees.

Employment